Artipe eryx, the green flash, is a species of butterfly belonging to the lycaenid family described by Carl Linnaeus in 1771. It is found in the Indomalayan realm (North India, Burma, China, Indochina, Peninsular Malaya, Taiwan, Borneo, Sulawesi, Japan).

The larvae feed on the fruits of Gardenia species, including Gardenia jasminoides and Gardenia florida.

Subspecies
Artipe eryx eryx (northern India, Burma, Thailand to Indo China, southern China)
Artipe eryx agis (Fruhstorfer, 1914) (southern Borneo)
Artipe eryx okinawana (Matsumura, 1919) (Japan)
Artipe eryx horiella (Matsumura, 1929) (Taiwan)
Artipe eryx alax Eliot, 1956 (southern Sulawesi)
Artipe eryx excellens Eliot, 1959 (Peninsular Malaysia)

References

External links
"Artipe Boisduval, 1870" at Markku Savela's Lepidoptera and Some Other Life Forms

Gallery

Artipe
Butterflies described in 1771
Butterflies of Asia
Taxa named by Carl Linnaeus